Žilvičiai is a village in Kėdainiai district municipality, in Kaunas County, in central Lithuania. According to the 2011 census, the village had a population of 48 people. It is located 3 km from Mantviliškis, by the Kruostas river.

Žilvičiai village was established in 1926, after the Grużewski's folwarks of Liubomislis and Zofijava had been parcelated.

Demography

References

Villages in Kaunas County
Kėdainiai District Municipality